Tribhuvan International Airport (Nepali: त्रिभुवन अन्तर्राष्ट्रिय विमानस्थल) (colloquially referred to as TIA) is an international airport located in Kathmandu, Bagmati, Nepal. It is operating with a tabletop runway, one domestic and an international terminal. As a main international airport, it connects Nepal to over 40 destinations in 17 countries.

The airport is a hub for two international airlines, the flag carrier Nepal Airlines and Himalaya Airlines, along with multiple domestic carriers. The airport is considered as a starting point for Mount Everest international tourists, with several daily flights to Lukla. Several airlines also offer Everest sightseeing flights out of Kathmandu.

Due to heavy traffic congestion, winter fog and the airport running out of its full capacity, the Government of Nepal 
promoted Gautam Buddha International Airport and Pokhara International Airport as an alternative airports in case of necessary diversions.

History

The airport was originally named Gauchaur Airport, after the area of Kathmandu where it was situated. In Nepali, "Gauchaur" refers to a place where cows graze. The formal beginning of aviation in Nepal occurred in 1949, with the landing of a Beechcraft Bonanza carrying the Indian ambassador. However, there are claims that there is evidence that Simara Airport existed in some form as early as 1946 and would therefore be the oldest airport in Nepal – this is, however, disputed.

The very first flight into Gauchaur happened on 23 April 1949.

The first charter flight took place between Gauchaur and Calcutta, in a Himalayan Aviation Dakota on 20 February 1950.

On 20 February 1950, an Indian registered Dakota DC-3 commenced the first ever scheduled service, linking Kathmandu to Patna, Kolkata and Delhi.

In 1950, King Tribhuvan took refuge at the Indian embassy in an attempt to overthrow the Rana dynasty. Gyanendra Bir Bikram Shah, the four-year-old grandson of Tribhuvan was crowned the new king. On 10 November 1950, two Indian planes landed at Gauchaur Airport and carried the young king along with his grandfather to Delhi. After the Delhi Accord, the Rana regime ended and King Tribhuvan landed at Gauchaur Airport as the monarch on 18 February 1951, bringing the waves of democracy in Nepal.

In 1952, the first scheduled domestic flights commenced to Bhairahawa, Biratnagar, Pokhara and Simara.

On 15 June 1955, the airport was inaugurated by King Mahendra and renamed Tribhuvan Airport in memory of the king's father. The airport was again renamed to Tribhuvan International Airport in 1964.

In 1957, the original  grass runway 16/34 was re-laid in concrete. In 1964, the former runway 16/34 was abandoned for a newer  runway 02/20. The runway was re-strengthened in 1981.

In 1961, Queen Elizabeth II landed in a Dakota plane for her first visit to Nepal, one of the most high-profile arrivals at the airport.

In 1967, Tribhuvan International Airport witnessed its first jet aircraft, a Lufthansa Boeing 707 and 1972, the Nepali flag carrier, Royal Nepal Airlines commenced jet operations from the airport with a Boeing 727. The same year, Nepali personnel took over air traffic services from the Indian personnel.

In 1985, the extension apron of the runway 02/20 was overlaid. Similarly, the development of the terminal building was commenced in the same year. In 1987, the construction of the Airlines Operation and Control Tower building was completed and the taxiway was overlaid. In the same year, on 11 October, Nepal witnessed the first ever landing of Concorde. In 1989, the construction of the terminal building was completed and on 18 February 1990, the newly built TIA complex were officially inaugurated by King Birendra Bir Bikram Shah.

In 1992, Necon Air, Nepal's first private airline commenced the domestic operations from TIA with Hawker Siddeley HS 748.

In 1995, works started to expand the domestic terminal. Likewise, Amplitude modulation signalling system (AMSS) and very-small-aperture terminal (V-SAT) were also installed at the airport.

In 1997, airport surveillance radar (ASR) and secondary surveillance radar (SSR) came into the operation. The installation of radar surveillance was proposed by Japan in 1994, following the crash of Thai Airways Flight 311 and Pakistan International Airlines Flight 268 in 1992, which claimed the lives of 280 people altogether; including the 17 high-level Japanese diplomats. On 9 September 1998, Prime Minister Girija Prasad Koirala officially inaugurated the radars.

In May 2007, Austrian Airlines discontinued its flight to Vienna, Nepal's last direct air link to Europe. In September 2013, Turkish Airlines launched direct flights from Istanbul to Kathmandu, re-establishing Nepal's connection with continental Europe.

In August 2013, the airport's only runway had to be closed for wide-body aircraft because the runway, which was in disrepair, could no longer withstand their weight.

In 2016, a new domestic terminal of 6300 m2 (67,813 sq. ft.) was opened, replacing the old terminal building of 2200 m2 (23,681 sq. ft.). The new facility is a temporary structure, and it cost Rs. 119.8 million to house passengers and office space for 15 local airlines.

In 2022, the airport extended its domestic terminal, with the new section of the building being exclusively used by Buddha Air.

Facilities

Apron 

The international apron at TIA can handle up to 17 aircraft, although only three can support wide-body category aircraft. There is also a bay at the eastern side of the airport that can hold two wide-body and two ATR 72 or similar type of aircraft. The eastern bay is used solely to park disabled or non-operational airplanes. With the completion of the construction of the two apron the parking capacity has increased to 17 aircraft.

The aprons at the domestic terminal have been accommodating up to 35 aircraft, despite its allowable capacity of only 17. The helipad at TIA can handle 
up to 17 helicopters.

Runway  
The airport has a single  runway with a slope of 1.2% oriented at 02/20. There is no instrument landing system available. The bitumen runway with the strength of PCN 54F/A/W/T has the markings of the centerline, edge, touchdown zone and the threshold. It has a 60 meters Runway Strip and 240 meters Runway End Safety Area (RESA). The runway has five intersections with the taxiways. The taxiway G runs parallel to the runway but it doesn't connect the thresholds.

Aids to Landing and Navigation 

There are two non-precision approach available at the Kathmandu Airport; VHF omnidirectional range along a distance measuring equipment (VOR/DME) and Required Area Navigation (RNAV/RNP). Due to mountainous terrain VOR/DME system are installed at Kathmandu and Bhattedanda for a better communication. A high intensity  extended centerline lights are installed at the southern end of the airport to assist with the approach. The runway is equipped with high intensity centerline lights, bidirectional raised edge lights, the threshold lights and the runway end lights. Precision approach path indicator (PAPI) lights (3°) are installed as landing aids for the two runways 02/20. There is however no ILS system installed in the airport.

Terminals 

There are two public terminals at the airport, one for international traffic and one for domestic traffic. The international terminal can handle up to 1350 departing passengers per hour, though it has been handling 2200 per hour at peak hours to suit the increasing demand of passengers.

A terminal for VIP guests is also operated by the Government of Nepal, where international state guests are welcomed. There are plans to construct a separate terminal for helicopter transportation.

Radisson Hotel Kathmandu operates an executive lounge for first and business class passengers for several airlines and Thai Airways operates a Royal Thai Silk lounge for its business-class passengers, as well as Star Alliance Gold card holders.

There is a duty-free shop in the departure area, and tea, coffee, and confectionery outlets that serve international travellers including A.B.P. Mart, Karki Multiple Trade and Suppliers. There are also baggage help desk, senior citizens and mother room, banking services and pre-paid taxi services to assist the travelling passengers at the terminal building.
The domestic terminal is located to the northern side of the airport, can be accessed using Free Shuttle Service from the airport main gate. In its temporary building, the domestic terminal has set aside 289 square metres for airline offices, 282 square metres for restaurants, and 58 square metres for lavatories. The terminal has a capacity of 765 passengers per hour.

Aircraft Maintenance 

Nepal Airlines operates a large hangar between the international and domestic terminals. There are plans to upgrade and move this facility to the eastern side of the airside. Buddha Air operates a closed door hangar facility, which can accommodate narrow-body aircraft at the eastern side of the airport.

Location and access 

It is in the middle of the junction of three ancient cities namely Kathmandu, Bhaktapur and Patan. The airport is connected to major parts of Kathmandu valley by the ring road.

Airlines and destinations

Passenger 

Buddha Air, Yeti Airlines, and Sita Air also provide daily mountain sightseeing flights or Mount Everest sightseeing flights out of Tribhuvan International Airport. They usually depart from the domestic terminal in the early morning hours and return to the airport one hour later.

The helicopter operators Air Dynasty, Manang Air, Prabhu Helicopter, Simrik Air, Shree Airlines and Fishtail Air offer helicopter operations out of their respective hubs at Tribhuvan International Airport.

Cargo

Statistics

Airline Market Share

Expansion
According to the CAAN Aviation Report – 2017, Tribhuvan International will undergo expansions under Transport Project Preparatory Facility funded partly by the Asian Development Bank. Major works include:

 Construction of a parallel taxiway system and side strip
 Construction of a new international terminal building
 Reconfiguration of existing international terminal building to domestic terminal building
 Relocation of Nepal Airlines hangar
 Relocation of Nepal Army infrastructure, hangar and other associated work

Ground transportation
Sajha Yatayat buses connect the airport's international terminal to Kathmandu's city centre, and Lalitpur's city centre. Buses from other local companies stop in front of the airport's main gate, 500 meters in front of the terminal buildings. Meter and prepaid taxis are available at both terminals at all hours.

Incidents and accidents
 On 10 May 1973, a Douglas DC-8 operated by Thai Airways overran the runway on landing with 100 of passengers and 10 crew on board, there was one fatality.
 On 31 July 1992, an Airbus A310-304, operating as Thai Airways International Flight 311 crashed into a mountain while approaching Kathmandu, killing all 113 people on board.
 On 28 September 1992, an Airbus A300 B4-203 operating as Pakistan International Airlines Flight 268 crashed while approaching Kathmandu, killing all 167 on board, making it the worst air accident in Nepal.
 On 17 January 1995, a de Havilland Canada DHC-6 Twin Otter operating as Royal Nepal Airlines Flight 133 from Kathmandu to Rumjatar, had problems getting airborne at Tribhuvan International Airport. The aircraft struck the airfield perimeter fence and plunged into fields. Of three crew and 21 passengers on board, one crew member and one passenger were killed.
 On 7 July 1999, a Boeing 727-200F operated by Lufthansa Cargo crashed in the Champadevi hills at the 7550 feet level, five minutes after takeoff, when it should have been at an altitude of 9500 feet. All five crew members on board were killed.
 On 5 September 1999, a BAe 748-501 Super 2B operating as Necon Air Flight 128 from Pokhara to Kathmandu, crashed while approaching Tribhuvan International Airport. The aircraft collided with a communication tower of Nepal Telecommunication Corporation and crashed in a wooded area 25 km west of Kathmandu. All 10 passengers and 5 crew were killed.
 On 26 December 1999, an Airbus A300B2-101 operating as Indian Airlines Flight 814 was hijacked en route from Kathmandu to Delhi. The aircraft ended up in Kandahar, Afghanistan. Indian Airlines suspended all flights to and from Nepal for some time, fearing a lack of security at check-in.
 On 24 December 2008, a de Havilland Canada DHC-6 Twin Otter operated by Nepal Airlines ran off the runway during takeoff
 On 24 August 2010, a Dornier 228 operating as Agni Air Flight 101 crashed into hills outside Kathmandu in heavy rain. All on board (3 crew, 11 passengers) were killed. The aircraft had left Tribhuvan International Airport, bound for Tenzing-Hillary Airport.
 On 25 September 2011, a Beechcraft 1900D operating as Buddha Air Flight 103, struck terrain while approaching Tribhuvan International Airport. There were 16 passengers and three crew members on board. Initial reports stated there was one survivor, who died en route to hospital. At the time of the crash, the weather was overcast with very low clouds and flights were operating under visual flight rules. The aircraft was on the base leg of the approach following a sightseeing flight.
 On 28 September 2012, a Dornier 228 operating as Sita Air Flight 601, crashed soon after take-off, after apparently hitting a vulture. Sixteen passengers and three crew members were killed.
 On 4 March 2015, an Airbus A330-300 operated by Turkish Airlines veered off the runway after attempting to land in dense fog. The aircraft had been circling for 30 minutes and was making its second landing attempt, after a previous aborted attempt due to poor visibility. The aircraft skidded into soft grass causing the nose wheel to collapse and the airport to temporarily close to all international flights. All 227 passengers and 11 crew members evacuated the aircraft safely.
 On 12 March 2018, a Bombardier Dash 8 Q400 operating as US-Bangla Airlines Flight 211, carrying 67 passengers and 4 crew veered off the runway while landing then crashed on the east side of Tribhuvan International Airport before catching fire. 47 passengers and 4 crew were killed.
 On 19 April 2018, a Boeing 737-900ER operated by Malindo Air on a scheduled flight to Kuala Lumpur, Malaysia overran the runway after a high-speed rejected takeoff. All 132 passengers and seven crew members escaped injury. Damage to the aircraft was minor, and the airport was closed for 12 hours until it was removed. The flight crew opted to abort the takeoff due to a warning indicated the aircraft was not correctly configured.
 On 1 September 2018, a BAe Jetstream 41 operated by Yeti Airlines en route from Nepalgunj skidded off the runway, seconds after touching down. All 21 passengers and the crew of 3, evacuated the aircraft safely without injuries but the aircraft was written off. Slippery runway due to rainfall was reported to be the cause of the incident.
 On 12 July 2019, a Yeti Airlines ATR 72-500, which was flying from Nepalgunj, skidded off the runway as it landed at Tribhuvan International Airport. There were 68 people aboard, including four crew members; all of them were able to safely exit the plane, but two passengers sustained minor injuries.

See also
 List of airports in Nepal

References

External links

 
 
 

Airports in Nepal
Transport in Kathmandu
Tourism in Kathmandu
1950 establishments in Nepal